is a horror anime anthology series adapted from the works of manga artist Junji Ito. Animated by Studio Deen, the anime adapts stories from several of Ito's collections. The series premiered on January 5, 2018, and ran for 12 episodes, accompanied by the release of two OVAs. The series was co-produced by Crunchyroll and began broadcasting on that service worldwide outside of Asia in eight languages on the same day.

Voice cast

Production
The anime was first announced June 30, 2017, via Junji Ito's page on the Asahi Shimbun website. In August, the adaptation was confirmed to be a television series with animation by Studio Deen. Shinobu Tagashira, known for his directorial work on Diabolik Lovers, directed and created the character design for the anime. The announcement also revealed that the series would adapt from two of Ito's manga collections, the 11 volume Junji Ito Masterpiece Collection and the single volume Fragments of Horror, but did not specify which stories would be adapted, as the staff wanted viewers to be surprised when the show aired. The series revealed its official title on October 12, 2017, and also announced that Kaoru Sawada was scripting the series, Hozumi Gōda was serving as sound director, and that Yuki Hayashi would compose the music for the series. The series will also include two OVAs, which will adapt Ito's Tomie manga.

The opening theme song, will be performed by The Pinballs, while the ending theme song, will be performed by JYOCHO.

Release
The series was initially scheduled to premiere on Tokyo MX on January 7, 2018, but was later announced for an January 5 premiere on WOWOW's Anime Premium programming block. Additionally, the series received an advance showing on December 23, 2017, which was attended by Ito and voice actor Yūji Mitsuya. The series is being simulcast on Crunchyroll worldwide outside of Asia, and Funimation began streaming an English dub on January 20, 2018.

The series ran for 12 episodes and was released as three separate sets on DVD, on March 30, 2018, April 27, 2018, and May 25, 2018. The second and third sets each include an OVA episode.

List of episodes

Notes

References

External links
  
 

Anime series based on manga
Animation anthology series
Crunchyroll anime
Funimation
Horror anime and manga
Fiction about monsters
Japanese anthology television series
Studio Deen
Tomie
Wowow original programming